The following is a list of notable deaths in November 2016.

Entries for each day are listed alphabetically by surname. A typical entry lists information in the following sequence:
Name, age, country of citizenship and reason for notability, established cause of death, reference.

November 2016

1
Sverre Andersen, 80, Norwegian football player and manager (Viking, national team), cancer.
Tina Anselmi, 89, Italian politician, Minister of Health (1978–1979).
Richard Ayling, 64, British Olympic rower.
Rosanne Bailey, 66, American air force general and academic administrator.
Auke Bloembergen, 89, Dutch jurist and legal scholar.
Dave Broadfoot, 90, Canadian comedian (Royal Canadian Air Farce).
Jean-Michel Damian, 69, French music radio journalist, complications during surgery.
Jan C. Dolan, 89, American politician.
Wim Ernes, 58, Dutch national equestrian coach.
Rodolfo Hinostroza, 75, Peruvian poet.
Don Kates, 75, American lawyer.
Bap Kennedy, 54, Northern Irish singer-songwriter, pancreatic and bowel cancer.
Pocho La Pantera, 65, Argentine singer, kidney cancer.
Martin Leach, 59, British automotive executive (NextEV Formula E Team), cancer.
Stanford Lipsey, 89, American publisher.
Massimo Mongai, 65, Italian author.
Earl E. Nelson, 79, American politician.
John Orsino, 78, American baseball player (Baltimore Orioles).
Zhang Benren, 87, Chinese geochemist and academician (Chinese Academy of Sciences).

2
Max Alexander, 63, American comedian and actor (Forgetting Sarah Marshall, Trainwreck, Paul Blart: Mall Cop 2), head and neck cancer.
Bob Cranshaw, 83, American jazz bassist (Blue Note Records, Musicians Union), cancer.
Vern Handrahan, 79, Canadian baseball player (Kansas City Athletics).
Jud Kinberg, 91, American producer (The Collector).
Dolores Klosowski, 93, American baseball player (Milwaukee Chicks).
A. Thomas Kraabel, 81, American classics scholar.
Martin Lippens, 82, Belgian footballer (Anderlecht, national team) and coach.
Korkut Özal, 87, Turkish engineer and politician.
Oleg Popov, 86, Russian clown (Moscow State Circus), heart attack.
Samuel Schatzmann, 61, Swiss equestrian, Olympic silver medalist (1988).
Jan Slepian, 95, American author and poet.
Jean-Marie Trappeniers, 74, Belgian footballer (Anderlecht, national team).
Giorgos Vasiliou, 66, Greek actor, lung cancer.
Egon Wolff, 90, Chilean playwright.

3
Fat'hi Abu Taleb, 83, Jordanian army general and diplomat.
W. D. Amaradeva, 88, Sri Lankan violinist, singer and composer.
Misha Brusilovsky, 85, Russian artist.
Vladimír Černý, 90, Slovak Olympic modern pentathlete (1956).
Clive Derby-Lewis, 80, South African politician, MP (1987–1989), convicted of conspiracy to murder Chris Hani, lung cancer.
Maurice Gaffney, 100, Irish barrister.
Yawar Hayat Khan, 73, Pakistani television producer, lung disease.
Börje Lampenius, 94, Finnish actor and director.
Marc Michel, 83, Swiss actor (The Umbrellas of Cherbourg, Lola).
Walter Piludu, 66, Italian politician, President of the Province of Cagliari (1988–1990).
Antonio Preto, 51, Italian politician.
Turid Karlsen Seim, 71, Norwegian theologian.
Mangat Ram Sharma, 88, Indian politician.
Kay Starr, 94, American singer ("Wheel of Fortune", "The Rock and Roll Waltz"), complications from Alzheimer's disease.
Rick Steiner, 69, American producer (The Producers, Hairspray).
Lene Tiemroth, 73, Danish actress (Italian for Beginners).
Xia Meng, 84, Hong Kong actress.
Jiyuan Yu, 52, Chinese moral philosopher, cancer.

4
Eddie Carnett, 100, American baseball player (Boston Braves, Chicago White Sox, Cleveland Indians).
DeVan Dallas, 90, American politician, member of the Mississippi House of Representatives (1964–1976).
Claude de Kemoularia, 94, French diplomat and banker.
Sylvio dos Santos, 81, Brazilian Olympic swimmer.
Allen Eller, 39, American soccer player (Baltimore Blast, Ohio Vortex).
Eddie Harsch, 59, Canadian keyboardist (The Black Crowes).
Khalid Kelly, 49, Irish Islamist (al-Muhajiroun), suicide bombing.
Max Mallmann, 48, Brazilian novelist, short story writer and screenwriter (Malhação, Coração de Estudante, A Grande Família), lung cancer.
Col Miller, 92, Australian politician, member of the Queensland Legislative Assembly for Ithaca (1966–1986).
Jean-Jacques Perrey, 87, French electronic music producer, lung cancer.
Mansour Pourheidari, 70, Iranian football player and manager (Esteghlal, national team), cancer.
Gunnar Sandgren, 87, Swedish novelist.
Ziaul Haque Zia, 63, Bangladeshi politician, Minister of Local Government (2001–2006).

5
John Carson, 89, English actor (Doomsday, Captain Kronos – Vampire Hunter, Doctor Who).
Marc de Bonte, 26, Belgian kickboxer, Muay thai world championship silver medalist (2012).
Israel Cavazos Garza, 93, Mexican historian.
Ralph Cicerone, 73, American scientist, President of National Academy of Sciences (2005–2016).
Rolando Espinosa, 66, Filipino politician, shot.
W. Eugene Hansen, 88, American religious leader (LDS Church), Alzheimer's disease.
M. R. Khan, 88, Bangladeshi paediatrician and professor.
Mel Lawrence, 81, American filmmaker and festival promoter.
Arnold Mesches, 93, American artist.
Julius Oketta, 60, Ugandan army general and politician.
Abdulla Oripov, 75, Uzbek poet, literary translator and politician, lyricist of State Anthem of Uzbekistan.
Laurent Pardo, 55, French bassist (Elliott Murphy).
Rodolfo Stavenhagen, 84, Mexican sociologist.
Marek Svatoš, 34, Slovak ice hockey player (Colorado Avalanche, Nashville Predators, Ottawa Senators), mixed drug intoxication.
Andreas Vgenopoulos, 63, Greek businessman and lawyer, heart attack.
Giles Waterfield, 67, British art historian and curator (Dulwich Picture Gallery), heart attack.

6
Roddy Evans, 81, Welsh rugby union player.
Mick Granger, 85, English footballer (York City), Alzheimer's disease.
Edward Itta, 71, American Iñupiat politician, Mayor of North Slope Borough, Alaska (2005–2011), member of U.S. Arctic Research Commission (2012–2015), cancer.
Chisela Kanchela, 29, Zambian Olympic swimmer (2004), diabetic attack.
Biser Kirov, 74, Bulgarian pop singer.
Zoltán Kocsis, 64, Hungarian pianist, conductor and composer.
Rafael Francisco Martínez Sáinz, 81, Mexican Roman Catholic prelate, Auxiliary Bishop of Guadalajara (2002–2012).
Thomas Martyn, 69, English rugby league player (Leigh, Warrington, national team).
Lalatendu Bidyadhar Mohapatra, 52, Indian politician, multiple organ failure.
Redovino Rizzardo, 77, Brazilian Roman Catholic prelate, Bishop of Dourados (2001–2015).
Jos Romersa, 101, Luxembourgian Olympic gymnast (1936).
Marc Sleen, 93, Belgian cartoonist and comics artist (The Adventures of Nero).
Vautour, 7, French-born Irish-trained racehorse, euthanised.

7
Zdeněk Altner, 69, Czech lawyer.
Genjiro Arato, 70, Japanese filmmaker and actor (Zigeunerweisen), heart disease.
May Claerhout, 77, Belgian artist, brain tumor.
Leonard Cohen, 82, Canadian singer-songwriter ("Hallelujah", "Suzanne", "First We Take Manhattan"), poet and novelist, complications from a fall.
Kanu Gandhi, 87, Indian scientist (NASA).
Thomas Gardner, 93, English footballer (Everton).
Phil Georgeff, 85, American racetrack announcer.
Julie Gregg, 79, American actress (The Godfather, The Happy Time, Batman), cancer.
Robert N. Hall, 96, American engineer and physicist.
Ingibjörg Haraldsdóttir, 74, Icelandic poet and translator.
Birger Jansen, 68, Norwegian Olympic ice hockey player (1972), (Frisk Asker) and sailor, cancer.
Consolata Kline, 100, American hospital administrator.
Mohamed Masmoudi, 91, Tunisian politician, Minister of Foreign Affairs (1970–1974).
Jayawantiben Mehta, 77, Indian politician, MP (1989–1991, 1996–1998, 1999–2004).
Silvano Miniati, 82, Italian politician and trade union organizer.
Eric Murray, 74, Scottish footballer (Kilmarnock).
Janet Reno, 78, American lawyer and politician, first female U.S. Attorney General (1993–2001), Parkinson's disease.
Joe Ryan, 80, American politician, member of the Alaska House of Representatives (1997–1999).
Samuel Sitta, 73, Tanzanian politician, MP (2005–2015).
Howard Taylor, 76, British structural engineer.
Sir Jimmy Young, 95, British radio personality (Radio 2) and singer ("Unchained Melody", "The Man from Laramie").

8
Peter Brixtofte, 66, Danish politician, Tax Minister (1992–1993).
Marlan Coughtry, 82, American baseball player (Boston Red Sox).
Raoul Coutard, 92, French cinematographer (Breathless, Z) and film director (Hoa-Binh).
Ian Cowan, 71, Scottish footballer (Partick Thistle, Falkirk, Dunfermline Athletic).
Yaffa Eliach, 79, Polish-born American Holocaust historian.
Kazimír Gajdoš, 82, Slovak footballer (Inter Bratislava, Czechoslovakia national team).
Aide Ganasi, Papua New Guinean politician, MP (since 2012), heart attack.
Giorgio Grigolli, 88, Italian politician, President of Trentino-Alto Adige/Südtirol (1967–1974) and Trentino (1974–1979).
Junius Foy Guin Jr., 92, American federal judge.
Ho Chih-chin, 64, Taiwanese politician, Minister of Finance (2006–2008).
Bill Lapham, 82, American football player (Philadelphia Eagles, Minnesota Vikings).
N. K. Mahajan, 97, Indian adventurer.
Touran Mirhadi, 89, Iranian educator.
Pertti Nieminen, 79, Finnish ice hockey player (HPK, TPS).
Russ Nixon, 81, American baseball player (Boston Red Sox, Cleveland Indians) and manager (Atlanta Braves).
V. P. Ramakrishna Pillai, 84, Indian politician.
Marius Popp, 81, Romanian jazz pianist and composer.
Eugene Roberts, 96, American neuroscientist.
Helga Ruebsamen, 82, Dutch writer.
John T. Skelly, 89, American journalist.
Umberto Veronesi, 90, Italian oncologist.

9
Emmanuel Kwasi Afranie, 73, Ghanaian football coach, traffic collision.
Greg Ballard, 61, American basketball player (Washington Bullets, Golden State Warriors), prostate cancer.
Jack Bodell, 76, English heavyweight boxer, British champion (1969–1970, 1971–1972).
Branse Burbridge, 95, British WWII fighter pilot.
Al Caiola, 96, American guitarist and composer.
Osamu Ishiguro, 80, Japanese tennis player, Asian Games champion (1966).
Irfan Shahîd, 90, Palestinian literature professor.
Martin Stone, 69, British guitarist (The Action) and bookseller, cancer.
La Veneno, 52, Spanish transsexual actress, singer and gossip celebrity, fall.

10
David Adamany, 80, American academic administrator, President of Temple University (2000–2006).
Ken Ballantyne, 76, Scottish runner.
Pierre Billard, 94, French film critic.
Carlos Alberto Cunha, 57, Brazilian judoka.
Trevor Johnson, 81, Australian footballer (Melbourne).
Don Keane, 85, Australian Olympic racewalker (1952, 1956).
Nikola Korabov, 87, Bulgarian director and screenwriter (Tobacco).
Francisco Nieva, 91, Spanish playwright.
André Ruellan, 94, French science fiction and horror writer.
Bill Stanfill, 69, American football player (Miami Dolphins), complications after a fall.

11
Ilse Aichinger, 95, Austrian writer.
Jum Jainudin Akbar, Filipino politician, member of the House of Representatives (since 2016), Governor of Basilan (2007–2016), cardiac arrest.
Victor Bailey, 56, American bassist (Weather Report, Madonna, Lady Gaga), complications from Charcot-Marie-Tooth disease and amyotrophic lateral sclerosis.
Uwe Bracht, 63, German footballer (Werder Bremen).
Alfredo Bruto da Costa, 78, Portuguese politician.
Željko Čajkovski, 91, Croatian football player (Dinamo Zagreb, Werder Bremen) and coach.
Clarence Ditlow, 72, American automotive safety advocate, colon cancer.
Doug Edwards, 70, Canadian musician and composer ("Wildflower"), cancer.
Perico Fernandez, 64, Spanish light-welterweight boxer, world champion (1974–1975), diabetes and Alzheimer's disease.
Greg Horton, 65, American football player (Los Angeles Rams, Tampa Bay Buccaneers).
Saki Kaskas, 45, Greek video game music composer (Need for Speed, Sleeping Dogs, Mass Effect 2), fentanyl overdose.
Leonid Keldysh, 85, Russian physicist.
Sir Ralph Kohn, 88, British medical scientist.
Claire Labine, 82, American author, screenwriter and producer (Ryan's Hope, General Hospital, One Life to Live).
Bonnie Laing, 79, Canadian politician, MLA for Calgary-Bow (1989–2001).
Lily, 64, Japanese singer and actress (Shinobi: Heart Under Blade), lung cancer.
Aileen Mehle, 98, American gossip columnist (The Miami Daily News, New York Journal-American, Women's Wear Daily).
Sir James McNeish, 85, New Zealand writer.
Ronnie Nathanielsz, 81, Sri Lankan-born Filipino sports journalist and commentator, cardiac arrest.
A. Nayyar, 61, Pakistani playback singer, cardiac arrest.
Pascal Posado, 91, French politician, member of the National Assembly for Bouches-du-Rhône (1978).
Alfred Schmidt, 81, German footballer (Borussia Dortmund, national team).
Ray Singleton, 79, American songwriter (Motown) and record producer, brain cancer.
Muhammad Surur, 77–78, Syrian religious leader.
Turki II bin Abdulaziz Al Saud, 81–82, Saudi Arabian prince and politician.
Sir Aubrey Trotman-Dickenson, 90, British chemist.
Robert Vaughn, 83, American actor (The Man from U.N.C.L.E., The Magnificent Seven, Bullitt), Emmy winner (1978), leukemia.

12
Mahmoud Abdel Aziz, 70, Egyptian actor (Al-Kit Kat).
Malek Chebel, 63, Algerian anthropologist and philosopher, cancer.
Dawn Coe-Jones, 56, Canadian golfer, chondrosarcoma.
Punya Datta, 92, Indian cricketer (Bengal).
Louis Devereux, 85, English cricketer (Worcestershire, Glamorgan).
Ebenezer Donkor, 78, Ghanaian actor (2016).
Jerry Dumas, 86, American cartoonist (Sam and Silo).
Bob Francis, 77, Egyptian-born Australian radio broadcaster (5AA).
Stanley G. Grizzle, 97, Canadian judge and political activist.
Robert Kabel, 82, Canadian ice hockey player (New York Rangers).
Frank Konigsberg, 83, American talent agent and producer (The Tommyknockers).
Adolf Kunstwadl, 76, German footballer (Bayern Munich, Wacker München).
Sonny Levi, 90, Indian powerboat designer.
Eivor Olson, 94, Swedish Olympic shot putter (1948, 1952).
James Dale Ritchie, 40, American serial killer, shot.
Howard Ruff, 85, American economist, Parkinson's disease.
Edgard Sorgeloos, 85, Belgian racing cyclist.
Lupita Tovar, 106, Mexican-American actress (Drácula, Santa, Miguel Strogoff), heart disease.
Paul Vergès, 91, Thai-born French Réunionese politician, MEP (2004–2010), member of the National Assembly (1956–1958, 1986–1987, 1993–1996) and Senate (1996–2004, since 2011).
Jacques Werup, 71, Swedish musician and writer, cancer.
Yu Xu, 30, Chinese air force aerobatic and fighter pilot, plane collision.

13
Jehangir Bader, 72, Pakistani politician, heart attack.
Maria Pilar Busquets, 79, Spanish Aranese writer and politician, Síndica d'Aran (1991-1993) and member of Catalan Parliament (1984-1992).
Luigi Caccia Dominioni, 102, Italian architect.
Doris Egbring-Kahn, 90, German actress.
Aslaug Fadum, 91, Norwegian politician.
Frederick Irving, 91, American diplomat, Ambassador to Iceland (1972-1976), Ambassador to Jamaica (1977-1978).
Leslie Kenton, 75, American writer.
Lary Kuharich, 70, American football coach (Calgary Stampeders, BC Lions), brain cancer.
Billy Miller, 62, American music historian, complications from multiple myeloma, kidney failure and diabetes.
Enzo Maiorca, 85, Italian free diver, television host and politician.
Jackie Pigeaud, 79, French historian.
Laurent Pokou, 69, Ivorian footballer (Rennes).
Leon Russell, 74, American Hall of Fame musician (The Wrecking Crew) and songwriter ("Tight Rope").
Don Rutherford, 79, English rugby union player.
Sir Mota Singh, 86, British judge.
Denys Smith, 92, British racehorse trainer. 
Aloysius Ferdinandus Zichem, 83, Surinamese Roman Catholic Redemptorist prelate, Bishop of Paramaribo (1971–2003).

14
Hans Avé Lallemant, 78, Dutch-born American geologist.
Diana Balmori, 84, American landscape designer.
Vladimir Belov, 58, Russian handball player, Olympic silver medalist (1980).
Houston Conwill, 69, American sculptor, prostate cancer.
Ibrahim Dasuki, 93, Nigerian spiritual leader, Sultan of Sokoto (1988–1996).
Holly Dunn, 59, American country music singer-songwriter ("Daddy's Hands", "Are You Ever Gonna Love Me", "You Really Had Me Going"), ovarian cancer.
Marti Friedlander, 88, New Zealand photographer, breast cancer.
Bob Gain, 87, American football player (Cleveland Browns).
Gun Hellsvik, 74, Swedish politician, Minister of Justice (1991–1994), cancer.
Roger Hobbs, 28, American author, overdose.
Gwen Ifill, 61, American journalist (PBS NewsHour, Washington Week), endometrial cancer.
Sebastian Leone, 91, American politician, pneumonia.
Mahpiya Ska, 20, American albino buffalo.
David Mancuso, 72, American DJ and founder of The Loft.
Gardnar Mulloy, 102, American tennis player, winner of the US Open (1942, 1945, 1946, 1948) and Wimbledon Championships (1957), complications from a stroke.
Janet Wright, 71, English-born Canadian actress (Corner Gas, The Perfect Storm, McCabe & Mrs. Miller).

15
Bob Addis, 91, American baseball player (Chicago Cubs, Boston Braves).
Mose Allison, 89, American jazz pianist, singer and songwriter ("Young Man Blues").
Nana Afia Kobi Serwaa Ampem II, 109, Ghanaian royal, Queen mother of the Ashanti Empire.
Cliff Barrows, 93, American music director (Billy Graham Evangelistic Association).
Rod Bieleski, 85, New Zealand plant physiologist.
Ray Brady, 79, Irish footballer (Millwall).
Victor Brown, 95, Cuban-born British singer. 
Bobby Campbell, 60, Northern Irish footballer (Bradford City), suicide by hanging.
Ishwar Dass Dhiman, 82, Indian politician.
Sixto Durán Ballén, 95, Ecuadorian politician, President (1992–1996).
Jules Eskin, 85, American cellist (Boston Symphony Orchestra), cancer.
Ken Grieve, 74, British television director (The Bill, Peak Practice, Doctor Who).
Daniel Leab, 80, German-born American historian.
Lisa Lynn Masters, 52, American actress (The Stepford Wives, It's Complicated, Unbreakable Kimmy Schmidt), apparent suicide by hanging.
Chester E. Norris, 88, American diplomat, Ambassador to Equatorial Guinea (1988–1992).
Milt Okun, 92, American singer and music producer.
Mukesh Rawal, 65, Indian actor (Ramayan), suicide by train.
Paul Rosche, 82, German engineer (BMW).
Clift Tsuji, 75, American politician, member of the Hawaii House of Representatives (since 2005).

16
Len Allchurch, 83, Welsh footballer (Swansea City, Sheffield United, national team).
Juan Amorós, 80, Spanish cinematographer.
Dwayne Andreas, 98, American businessman.
Joan Carroll, 85, American child actress (Meet Me in St. Louis).
Teresita Castillo, 89, Filipino nun.
Jay Wright Forrester, 98, American computer engineer and systems scientist.
Melvin Laird, 94, American politician and writer, Secretary of Defense (1969–1973), U.S. Representative from Wisconsin's 7th congressional district (1953–1969), respiratory failure.
Hans-Günter Neues, 66, German football player (Fortuna Köln, 1.FC Kaiserslautern) and coach.
Enno Penno, 86, Estonian politician.
Daniel Prodan, 44, Romanian footballer (Steaua Bucharest, Atlético Madrid, national team), heart attack.
Guillaume Raskin, 79, Belgian footballer.
Alex Stewart, 52, Jamaican Olympic boxer (1984), blood clot in lung.
Larry Tucker, 81, American politician, member of the West Virginia House of Delegates (1970–1982) and Senate (1983–1989).
Mentor Williams, 70, American songwriter and producer ("Drift Away", "When We Make Love"), lung cancer.
Jean Wishart, 96, New Zealand journalist, editor of New Zealand Woman's Weekly (1952–1985).
Yeh Changti, 82–83, Taiwanese aviator, member of the Black Cat Squadron, heart attack.

17
Zenon Czechowski, 69, Polish Olympic cyclist (1968).
Virgilio Godoy, 82, Nicaraguan politician, Vice President (1990–1995).
Ruth Gruber, 105, American journalist (New York Herald Tribune).
Marzieh Hadidchi, 77, Iranian Revolutionary Guard commander and politician, MP (1984–2000).
Babanrao Haldankar, 89, Indian classical singer and composer.
Joseph Khoury, 80, Lebanese-born Canadian Roman Catholic hierarch, Bishop of Saint Maron of Montreal (1996–2013).
Khairulla Murtazin, 75, Russian mathematician.
Fidel Negrete, 84, Mexican Olympic long-distance runner (1964), Pan American gold medalist (1963).
John Ningark, 72, Canadian politician, member of the Legislative Assembly of the Northwest Territories (1989–1999) and Nunavut (2009–2013), cancer.
Louis Pinton, 68, French politician.
John Pridnia, 73, American politician, amyotrophic lateral sclerosis.
Venancio Shinki, 84, Peruvian painter.
Harry W. Shipps, 90, American Episcopal prelate, Bishop of Georgia (1985–1994).
Srinivas Kumar Sinha, 90, Indian army general and politician, Governor of Assam (1997–2003), Arunachal Pradesh (1999) and Jammu and Kashmir (2003–2008).
Whitney Smith, 76, American vexillologist, designer of the flag of Guyana, co-designer of the flag of Bonaire.
Steve Truglia, 54, British stuntman (The Wolfman, Mission: Impossible – Rogue Nation, Hollyoaks), fall.
Don Waller, 65, American music journalist and singer, lung cancer.
Gérard Weber, 67, French politician.

18
Haji Muhammad Adeel, 72, Pakistani politician, kidney failure.
Denton Cooley, 96, American heart surgeon.
Jerzy Cynk, 91, Polish-British aviation historian.
Ed Francis, 90, American professional wrestler and promoter.
Sharon Jones, 60, American singer (Sharon Jones & The Dap-Kings), pancreatic cancer.
Valentin Kornev, 75, Russian sport shooter, Olympic silver medalist (1968).
Yevgeni Lazarev, 79, Russian-American actor (Iron Man 2, The Sum of All Fears, Call of Duty 4: Modern Warfare), heart failure.
Liu Sung-pan, 84, Taiwanese politician, member (1973–2004) and President (1992–1999) of the Legislative Yuan.
Hugh McDonald, 62, Australian musician (Redgum), prostate cancer.
Bob Mitchell, 80, Canadian politician.
Francesco Parisi, 86, Italian politician, member of the Senate (1987–1994) and Parliament (1994–1996).
Kervin Piñerua, 25, Venezuelan volleyball player (national team), heart attack.
Freddie L. Poston, 91, American lieutenant general in the United States Air Force.
Théophane Matthew Thannickunnel, 88, Indian Roman Catholic prelate, Bishop of Jabalpur (1976–2001).
Armando Tobar, 78, Chilean footballer (national team, Club Deportivo Universidad Católica), Alzheimer's disease.

19
Sutan Bhatoegana, 59, Indonesian politician, liver cancer.
Monk Bonasorte, 59, American football player (Florida State Seminoles), brain cancer.
John C. Carpenter, 86, American politician, member of the Nevada Assembly (1986–2010).
John Dale, 86, English cricketer (Kent, Lincolnshire).
Donald Farley, 46, Canadian Olympic cross-country skier (1998, 2002), suspected heart attack.
Irving A. Fradkin, 95, American philanthropist, founder of Scholarship America.
Gino Gavioli, 93, Italian comics artist and animator.
Erwin Hecht, 83, German-born South African Roman Catholic prelate, Bishop of Kimberley (1974–2009).
Jacques Henry, 74, French rally driver.
Jan Huberts, 79, Dutch motorcycle road racer.
Ida Levin, 53, American violinist, leukemia.
Józef Mayer, 77, Polish chemist.
Aiace Parolin, 96, Italian cinematographer (Seduced and Abandoned, Keoma, The Birds, the Bees and the Italians).
Christian Salaba, 45, Austrian footballer (Rapid Wien, Vienna).
Paul Sylbert, 88, American production designer (Heaven Can Wait, The Prince of Tides, One Flew Over the Cuckoo's Nest), Oscar winner (1979).
David Turner-Samuels, 98, British barrister.
Hans Witsenhausen, 86, German mathematician.
You Xiaozeng, 83, Chinese inorganic chemist and academician (Chinese Academy of Sciences).

20
Gabriel Badilla, 32, Costa Rican footballer (Saprissa, New England Revolution), heart failure.
Wimal Kumara de Costa, 68, Sri Lankan film actor (Bambaru Awith).
Likhit Dhiravegin, 75, Thai political scientist and politician, cancer.
Housseyn Fardjallah, 23, Algerian weightlifter, traffic collision.
Maria Glazovskaya, 104, Russian scientist and agrochemist.
Gene Guarilia, 78, American basketball player (Boston Celtics).
Tim Heald, 72, British author and journalist.
Janellen Huttenlocher, 84, American psychologist.
Mita Mohi, 78, New Zealand rugby league player (Canterbury, national team), traditional Māori weaponry expert.
Hod O'Brien, 80, American jazz pianist, cancer.
Diógenes da Silva Matthes, 83, Brazilian Roman Catholic prelate, Bishop of Franca (1971–2006).
Konstantinos Stephanopoulos, 90, Greek politician, President (1995–2005), pneumonia.
Hemant Talwalkar, 62, Indian cricketer.
William Trevor, 88, Irish writer (Love and Summer, Two Lives, The Children of Dynmouth).
Ivan Živković, 69, Serbian diplomat, ambassador to Kenya.

21
Kaylin Andres, 31, American blogger, cancer. 
Blakdyak, 46, Filipino reggae artist and comedian.
Ergi Dini, 22, Albanian singer, motorcycle accident.
Yehia El-Gamal, 86, Egyptian politician, Deputy Prime Minister (2011).
Rose Evansky, 94, British hairdresser.
Tom Fisher, 74, American baseball player.
Edward L. Kimball, 86, American legal scholar and biographer.
Masatoshi Kurata, 77, Japanese politician, cancer.
Matthias Mauritz, 92, German Olympic football player (1952, 1956).
John Nuraney, 79, Kenyan-born Canadian politician, MLA of British Columbia (2001–2009).
Jean-Claude Risset, 78, French composer.
Hassan Sadpara, 53, Pakistani mountaineer, cancer.
Vladimir Semyonov, 78, Russian Olympic water polo player (1960, 1964, 1968).
Jan Sonnergaard, 53, Danish writer, heart attack.
René Vignal, 90, French footballer.
Maximilian Ziegelbauer, 93, German Roman Catholic prelate, Auxiliary Bishop of Augsburg (1983–1998).

22
Tayssir Akla, 77, Syrian composer and conductor.
M. Balamuralikrishna, 86, Indian Carnatic musician and composer.
Donald Barker, 86, Canadian football official (Canadian Football League).
Dorian Boose, 42, American football player (New York Jets, Washington Redskins, Edmonton Eskimos).
Mike Burgoyne, 65, New Zealand rugby union player (North Auckland, national team).
Chen Yingzhen, 79, Taiwanese writer.
Bill Dimock, 93, Canadian ice hockey player (Sudbury Wolves).
Carlos Fayt, 98, Argentine lawyer and politician.
Rosa Anna Garavoglia, 83, Italian executive.
Servaas Huys, 76, Dutch politician, member of the House of Representatives (1986–1998).
Gloria Lane, 91, American operatic mezzo-soprano.
M. G. K. Menon, 88, Indian physicist.
John C. O'Riordan, 92, Irish-born Sierra Leonean Roman Catholic prelate, Bishop of Kenema (1984–2002).
Moeenuddin Ahmad Qureshi, 86, Pakistani politician, Acting Prime Minister (1993), lung infection.
Viveki Rai, 92, Indian author.
Red Marauder, 26, British racehorse, winner of the 2001 Grand National.
Judith Roberts, 82, American Olympic swimmer (1952).
Peter Sumner, 74, Australian actor (Ned Kelly, Star Wars, Heartbreak High).
Mathew Vattackuzhy, 86, Indian Syro-Malabar Catholic hierarch, Bishop of Kanjirappally (1986–2000).
Ram Naresh Yadav, 90, Indian politician, Chief Minister of Uttar Pradesh (1977–1979), Governor of Chhattisgarh (2014) and Madhya Pradesh (2014–2016).

23
Rita Barberá, 68, Spanish politician, Mayor of Valencia (1991–2015) and Senator (since 2015), heart attack due to cirrhosis.
Ralph Branca, 90, American baseball player (Brooklyn Dodgers, Detroit Tigers).
Brainbug, 57, Italian trance music producer and musician.
Michel Deza, 77, Russian-born French mathematician.
Richard Dougherty, 84, Canadian-born American ice hockey player, Olympic silver medalist (1956).
John Ebersole, 72, American educator, President of Excelsior College (2006–2016), myelodysplastic syndrome.
Joe Esposito, 78, American author and publisher, road manager for Elvis Presley.
Bill Hewitt, 86, Australian politician, member of the Queensland Legislative Assembly for Chatsworth (1966–1977) and Greenslopes (1977–1983).
Ernst Hilmar, 78, Austrian musicologist.
Stan Huntsman, 84, American Olympic track and field coach, complications from a stroke.
Karin Johannisson, 72, Swedish idea historian, cancer.
Sagardeep Kaur, 35, Indian athlete, Asian champion (2002), traffic collision.
Peggy Kirk Bell, 95, American professional golfer (LPGA).
Joe Lennon, 81, Irish Gaelic footballer (Down).
Renato López, 33, Mexican actor and television host, shot.
Rocky Malebane-Metsing, 67, South African politician.
Abdul-Karim Mousavi Ardebili, 90, Iranian cleric and jurist, Chief Justice of Iran (1981–1989).
Guy Rousseau, 81, Canadian ice hockey player (Montreal Canadiens).
Ryu Mi-yong, 95, North Korean politician, chairwoman of the Chondoist Chongu Party, lung cancer.
Andrew Sachs, 86, German-born British actor (Fawlty Towers, Coronation Street, Hitler: The Last Ten Days), dementia.
Fred Stobaugh, 99, American songwriter.
K. Subash, 57, Indian director and screenwriter, kidney failure.
Jerry Tucker, 91, American child actor (Our Gang).

24
Michael Abbensetts, 78, Guyanese-born British playwright.
Colonel Abrams, 67, American musician ("Trapped").
Nadine Alari, 89, French actress.
Marcos Ana, 96, Spanish communist activist, poet and veteran of the Spanish Civil War, political prisoner (1939-1961).
Al Brodax, 90, American film and television producer (Yellow Submarine).
Matthew Chan, 69, Hong Kong Olympic fencer (1972, 1976), cancer.
Bob Chase, 90, American broadcaster (WOWO, Fort Wayne Komets), heart failure.
Dave Ferriss, 94, American baseball player (Boston Red Sox).
Shirley Bunnie Foy, 80, American jazz musician.
Larry W. Fullerton, 65, American inventor, brain cancer.
Paul Futcher, 60, English footballer (Manchester City, Barnsley, Grimsby Town), cancer.
Royal U. Grote Jr., 70, American prelate, Bishop of the Reformed Episcopal Church.
Florence Henderson, 82, American actress (The Brady Bunch, Song of Norway, The Sound of Music) and singer, heart failure.
Prabhjot Kaur, 92, Indian author and poet.
William Mandel, 99, American broadcast journalist, political activist and author.
Boris Melnik, 71, Soviet Olympic sports shooter, silver medallist (1972).
Luis Miquilena, 97, Venezuelan politician, Minister of Interior and Justice (2001–2002).
Pauline Oliveros, 84, American composer and accordionist.
George C. Royal, 95, American microbiologist.
Sabrina, 80, British model and actress.
Charles M. Stein, 96, American statistician.
Tormod Petter Svennevig, 87, Norwegian diplomat and politician.
Norm Swanson, 86, American basketball player (Rochester Royals).
Jules Sylvain, 90, Canadian Olympic weightlifter.

25
Bernardo Álvarez Herrera, 60, Venezuelan diplomat, Ambassador to the United States (2003–2010).
Erich Bloch, 91, German-born American electrical engineer, director of the National Science Foundation (1984–1990).
Fidel Castro, 90, Cuban politician, Prime Minister (1959–1976), President (1976–2008).
Ron Glass, 71, American actor (Barney Miller, Firefly, Lakeview Terrace), respiratory failure.
Jim Gillespie, 69, Scottish footballer (Dunfermline Athletic).
Trevor Goddard, 85, South African cricketer.
David Hamilton, 83, British photographer.
Dwan Hurt, 53, American basketball coach (Serra Cavaliers).
Zdzisław Konieczny, 86, Polish historian. 
Jake Krull, 77, American politician, member of the South Dakota Senate (1973–1983).
Burton J. Lee III, 86, American doctor, White House physician under President George H. W. Bush, bladder cancer.
Ivan Mikoyan, 89, Russian aircraft designer (Mikoyan MiG-29).
Russell Oberlin, 88, American countertenor.
Margaret Rhodes, 91, British writer, cousin of Elizabeth II.
Richard Dean Rogers, 94, American district court judge, U. S. District Court for the District of Kansas (since 1975).
Peter Schweri, 77, Swiss painter.
Bill Skelton, 85, New Zealand jockey.
Thomas Taylor, Baron Taylor of Blackburn, 87, British politician, injuries sustained in traffic collision.
Alexander Yossifov, 76, Bulgarian composer.

26
Ida Blom, 85, Norwegian historian.
Bill Endicott, 98, American baseball player (St. Louis Cardinals).
Urii Eliseev, 20, Russian chess grandmaster, fall.
Miriam Eshkol, 87, Israeli education administrator.
Harry Flournoy, 72, American basketball player (UTEP).
Alv Gjestvang, 79, Norwegian speed skater, Olympic silver medalist (1964), cancer.
Peter Hintze, 66, German politician, General Secretary of the CDU (1992–1998), vice-president of the Bundestag (2013–2016).
Peter Hans Kolvenbach, 87, Dutch religious leader, Superior General of the Society of Jesus (1983–2008).
James E. McClellan, 90, American politician, member of the Maryland House of Delegates (1978–1994).
Jean Moore, 83, Australian politician, member of the Tasmanian Legislative Council (1992–1994).
David Provan, 75, Scottish footballer (Rangers).
Chad Robinson, 36, Australian rugby league footballer (Sydney Roosters, Parramatta Eels), suicide by traffic collision.
Debra Saunders-White, 59, American educator, Chancellor of North Carolina Central University (since 2013), kidney cancer.
Nils-Börje Stormbom, 91, Finnish author.
Velko Valkanov, 88, Bulgarian politician.
Fritz Weaver, 90, American actor (Fail Safe, Holocaust, Creepshow), Tony winner (1970).

27
Nijolė Ambrazaitytė, 77, Lithuanian opera singer and politician.
Joan Burke, 88, Irish politician.
Bernard Gallagher, 87, British actor (Casualty, Crown Court, Downton Abbey).
Valerie Gaunt, 84, British actress (The Curse of Frankenstein, Dracula).
Jorge Luis González Tanquero, 46, Cuban dissident and prisoner of conscience.
Ioannis Grivas, 93, Greek politician, Prime Minister (1989).
Paul Guers, 88, French actor (Kali Yug: Goddess of Vengeance).
Viktor Ivannikov, 76, Russian computer scientist.
Lim Chiew Peng, 65, Singaporean footballer, cancer.
Graham Lay, 56, British antiques expert (Antiques Roadshow), cystic fibrosis.
Dick Logan, 86, American football player (Green Bay Packers).
Tony Martell, 90, American music industry executive.
Bruce Mazlish, 93, American historian.
Thomas Pazyj, 61, Danish Olympic handball player (1976, 1980).
Alan Preen, 81, Australian sportsman.
Wayne Smith, 66, Canadian football player (Ottawa Rough Riders, Toronto Argonauts).
Brian Spalding, 93, British scientist.
William Lay Thompson, 86, American ornithologist.
Anand Yadav, 80, Indian Marathi writer.

28
Bill Bell, 87–88, Canadian Olympic basketball player.
William Christenberry, 80, American artist, Alzheimer's disease.
Jim Delligatti, 98, American entrepreneur, creator of the Big Mac.
Haruka Eigen, 70, Japanese professional wrestler (AJPW, NJPW) and executive (Pro Wrestling Noah), heart attack.
Hezi Eshel, 85, Israeli military officer.
 John C. Harkness, 99, American architect.
Adolfo Horta, 59, Cuban featherweight boxer, Olympic silver medalist (1980).
Carlton Kitto, 74, Indian jazz guitarist.
Georg Lhotsky, 79, Austrian actor and director (Moss on the Stones).
Mai Yinghao, 87, Chinese archaeologist (Mausoleum of the Nanyue King), cancer.
Ng Bi-chu, 88, Taiwanese activist, complications of diabetes.
Lolita Rodriguez, 81, Philippine actress, heart attack.
Udiramala Subramaniam, 69, Indian cricketer.
Sir John Swire, 89, British businessman (Swire Group).
Mark Taimanov, 90, Russian Soviet-era chess grandmaster and concert pianist, USSR chess champion (1956).
Ivar Thomassen, 62, Norwegian folk singer-songwriter.
Grant Tinker, 90, American television executive, CEO of NBC (1981–1986).
André Tranchemontagne, 77, Canadian politician, Member of the Quebec National Assembly for Mont-Royal (1998-2003).
Burghild Wieczorek, 73, German Olympic athlete.
Van Williams, 82, American actor (The Green Hornet), renal failure.
Keo Woolford, 49, American filmmaker and actor (Hawaii Five-0, Godzilla, Act of Valor), complications from a stroke.
Lyudmila Yurlova, 44, Russian ice hockey player, smoke inhalation.
Notable Brazilian people killed in the crash of LaMia Flight 2933:
Ailton Canela, 22, football player (Chapecoense).
Dener Assunção Braz, 25, football player (Chapecoense).<ref
name="nbcnews1"/>
Sérgio Manoel Barbosa Santos, 27, football player (Chapecoense).
Matheus Biteco, 21, football player (Chapecoense, Grêmio).
Mateus Caramelo, 22, football player (Chapecoense).<ref
name="nbcnews1"/>
Ananias Eloi Castro Monteiro, 27, football player (Chapecoense, Portuguesa).<ref
name="nbcnews1"/>
Victorino Chermont, 43, reporter (Fox Sports).
Paulo Julio Clement, 51, commentator (Fox Sports).
José Gildeixon Clemente de Paiva, 29, football player (Chapecoense, Coritiba).
Guilherme Gimenez de Souza, 21, football player (Chapecoense).<ref
name="nbcnews1"/>
Lucas Gomes da Silva, 26, football player (Chapecoense).
Josimar, 30, football player (Chapecoense).<ref
name="nbcnews1"/>
Caio Júnior, 51, football player and manager (Chapecoense, Vitória de Guimarães).
Everton Kempes dos Santos Gonçalves, 34, football player (Chapecoense, JEF United Chiba).
Filipe Machado, 32, football player (Chapecoense, CSKA Sofia).
Arthur Maia, 24, football player (Chapecoense, Vitória).
Marcelo Augusto Mathias da Silva, 25, football player (Chapecoense, Flamengo).
Delfim Peixoto, 75, politician and football executive, vice-president of CBF, president of Federação Catarinense de Futebol and congressman.
Mário Sérgio Pontes de Paiva, 66, football player, manager, and commentator (Fox Sports).
Bruno Rangel, 34, football player (Chapecoense).<ref
name="nbcnews1"/>
Cléber Santana, 35, football player (Chapecoense, Atlético Madrid).
Tiaguinho, 22, football player (Chapecoense).
Thiego, 30, football player (Chapecoense, Grêmio).

29
Bill Barrot, 72, Australian football player (Richmond).
Bill Bartmann, 68, American businessman, complications from heart surgery.
Margaret Belcher, 80, New Zealand literary scholar. 
Ray Columbus, 74, New Zealand rock singer (Ray Columbus & the Invaders).
James Danieley, 92, American educator, President of Elon University (1957–1973).
Marcos Danilo Padilha, 31, Brazilian football player (Chapecoense), injuries sustained in a plane crash.
Joe Dever, 60, British author (Lone Wolf), complications from bile duct surgery.
Duncan B. Forrester, 83, Scottish theologian.
Luis Alberto Monge, 90, Costa Rican politician, President (1982–1986), cardiac arrest.
Hardy Myers, 77, American politician, Attorney General for Oregon (1997–2009), complications from pneumonia.
Norman Oakley, 77, English footballer (Hartlepool United, Doncaster Rovers, Grimsby Town).
Roger Parent, 63, Canadian politician, cancer.
Claudio Pavone, 95, Italian historian.
Andrew Rippin, 66, British-born Canadian Islamic historian.
Ruta Šaca-Marjaša, 89, Latvian lawyer, writer and politician, MP (1990–1998).
Lana Spreeman, 61, Canadian alpine skier, Paralympic gold medalist (1980), brain cancer.
Richard B. Teitelman, 69, American judge (Supreme Court of Missouri).
Alexander Thieme, 62, German sprinter, Olympic silver medalist (1976).
Allan Zavod, 71, Australian pianist, brain cancer.

30
Alice Drummond, 88, American actress (Ghostbusters, Awakenings, Doubt), complications from a fall.
Amar Ezzahi, 75, Algerian Chaabi singer.
Michel Houel, 74, French politician, mayor of Crécy-la-Chapelle (2001–2015) and member of the Senate (since 2004).
Kamilló Lendvay, 87, Hungarian composer and conductor.
Leonard of Mayfair, 78, British celebrity hairdresser.
Aleksei Maslennikov, 87, Russian tenor.
Peng Chang-kuei, 97, Taiwanese chef, inventor of General Tso's Chicken, pneumonia.
Sinclair Stevens, 89, Canadian politician, Leader of the Progressive Canadian Party (since 2007), heart attack.
Lionel Stoléru, 79, French politician and conductor.
Erdal Tosun, 53, Turkish actor (G.O.R.A., Vizontele), traffic collision. 
Royce Womble, 85, American football player (Baltimore Colts).

References

2016-11
 11